This is a list of United Nations General Assembly resolutions at the sixty-sixth session of the United Nations General Assembly.

Resolutions

References

2011 in international relations
2012 in international relations
United Nations General Assembly resolutions